Deh Shahdust may refer to:
 Deh Shahdust, Kerman
 Deh Shahdust, Sistan and Baluchestan